is a Japanese professional footballer who plays as a defender for J2 League club Blaublitz Akita, on loan from Fagiano Okayama.

Club career
After attending Higashifukuoka High School, Abe signed for Fagiano Okayama for 2018 season and unexpectedly found immediate space, even scoring on his 2nd ever cap in J2 League against Tochigi SC.

Club statistics
Updated to 20 December 2022.

References

External links

Profile at J. League

1999 births
Living people
Association football people from Ōita Prefecture
Japanese footballers
Fagiano Okayama players
Blaublitz Akita players
J2 League players
Association football defenders